Veurne-Ambacht was a viscounty ( kasselrij, burggraafschap) in the County of Flanders. Agriculture contributed mostly to the prosperous area.

In the viscountship's capital city Veurne, the Landhuis was the seat of the viscountcy.

Nowadays Veurne-Ambacht is the name of the northwestern corner of the Belgian province of West Flanders.

References

External links
 Welcome in Veurne, Website of Veurne City
 History of Veurne and Veurne-Ambacht

Geography of West Flanders
County of Flanders
Regions of Flanders
Areas of Belgium